Jessica Rey (born October 15, 1982), is an American actress and fashion designer. She is perhaps best known for her role as Alyssa Enrilé/White Wild Force Ranger in the TV series Power Rangers Wild Force. She is also the founder and CEO of Rey Swimwear.

Early life and career
Rey was born in Fort Campbell, Kentucky and moved with her parents at age three to Orange County, California.  Rey was raised Catholic. She graduated from California State University, Fullerton with a BA in accounting. She then moved to Los Angeles, where she earned an MBA in marketing at Loyola Marymount University. She worked in a TV production company where people encouraged her to act. She has appeared in commercials for Time Warner and Gillette Tag Body Spray and in print-ads for T-Mobile and Verizon.

Rey played Alyssa Enrilé/White Wild Force Ranger in the TV series Power Rangers Wild Force. She was cast in a role on the sit-com Rules of Engagement.

She started a retail company selling swimwear using the actress Audrey Hepburn as inspiration for her designs. She is also a speaker and travels to talk about chastity and modesty.

She is married and has two sons and a daughter.

Filmography
 The Young and the Restless (1993, TV Series)  - 'Jabot' make-up girl
 Power Rangers Wild Force (2002, TV Series) - Alyssa Enrilé] / White Wild Force Ranger 
 The Lawyer Trap (2004) - Alana
 The Stones
 The Big Bang (2004) - Kelli
 Las Vegas (2004, TV Series) - Kelli
 Rules of Engagement (2007, TV Series) - Polynesian waitress
 General Hospital (2009, TV Series) - Marita
 No Nerds Here (2014) - Herself

References

External links
 Official website
 
 
 
 Jessica Rey  at TV.com
 Jessica Rey Swimwear

1982 births
American people of Filipino descent
Actresses from California
Actresses from Kentucky
American fashion designers
American women fashion designers
American television actresses
California State University, Fullerton alumni
Living people
Loyola Marymount University alumni
Actors from Orange County, California
Catholics from California
21st-century American women